As Other Men Are is a 1925 collection of short stories by the English author Dornford Yates (Cecil William Mercer), first published in The Windsor Magazine. The title is a reference to the parable of the Pharisee and the Publican.

Plot 
The book consists of ten short stories, many of which revolve around the relations between an impecunious former officer of the Great War and a woman of wealth. The title of each is the name of a significant male character.

Background 
The stories were written for The Windsor Magazine.

Chapters

Critical reception 
The author’s biographer AJ Smithers noted that these tales have a rather harsher tone than that of the earlier stories. Although they all have a happy ending, as required by the editor of The Windsor Magazine, he felt that by this date the writer was no longer seeing romance in the old-fashioned way. Some of his women can be greedy and vinegar-tongued, particularly the American women. Mercer's own wife, Bettine, was American and Smithers speculated that his tone was a reflection of the couple's marital problems, or that these stories were intended as a deliberate insult to her.

References

Bibliography

External links
Full text of the stories at HathiTrust Digital Library:
 Chapter 1: Jeremy: Unto Caesar
 Chapter 2: Simon: Shorn Lambs
 Chapter 3: Toby: Without Prejudice
 Chapter 4: Oliver: Old Ale
 Chapter 5: Christopher: The Lord of the Manor
 Chapter 6: Ivan: Leading Strings
 Chapter 7: Hubert: Contrary Winds
 Chapter 8: Titus: Ways and Means
 Chapter 9: Peregrine: Fallen Sparrows
 Chapter 10: Derry: The Flat of the Sword

1925 short story collections
Ward, Lock & Co. books
Short story collections by Dornford Yates